Angelo De Donatis (born 4 January 1954) is an Italian Catholic prelate who currently serves as Cardinal Vicar (officially Vicar General of His Holiness), Archpriest of the Archbasilica of St. John Lateran, and Grand Chancellor of the Pontifical Lateran University.

He was the first person since the 16th century to be appointed Vicar General of Rome while not a cardinal; he was an archbishop when appointed and became a cardinal thirteen months later. Prior to his appointment as Cardinal Vicar, De Donatis was an auxiliary bishop of the Diocese of Rome.

In the spring of 2020, he was in hospital in Rome for eleven days after testing positive for COVID-19.

Biography 
Angelo De Donatis was born on 4 January 1954 in Casarano, a comune in the Province of Lecce and the Italian region of Apulia. He attended the seminary of Taranto and the Pontifical Roman Major Seminary. While in Rome, he studied philosophy at the Pontifical Lateran University and theology at the Pontifical Gregorian University, where he earned a Licentiate of Sacred Theology in moral theology.

Priestly ministry 
On 12 April 1980, De Donatis was ordained a priest in the Church of San Domenico in Casarano in the Diocese of Nardò-Gallipoli by Bishop Antonio Rosario Mennonna. He then taught religion at the Church of San Saturnino in Rome, of which he later became vicar. He was incardinated in the Diocese of Rome on 28 November 1983.

From 1989 to 1991, De Donatis was the archivist of the Secretary of the College of Cardinals. He became the spiritual director of the Pontifical Roman Major Seminary, where he served until 2003, when he was appointed a parish priest at the Basilica of San Marco Evangelista al Campidoglio in Rome and an assistant for the National Association of Relatives of Clergy. He also served as the director of the clergy of the Vicariate of Rome from 1990 to 1996. He then became a member of the pastoral council and the college of consultors of the Diocese of Rome.

De Donatis was admitted as a knight to the Equestrian Order of the Holy Sepulchre of Jerusalem in 1989. On 10 April 1990, he was appointed a Chaplain of His Holiness, receiving the title of monsignor. 

In 2017 he was a spiritual assistant to the Don Andrea Santoro Association, which marks the anniversary of the assassination in Turkey in 2006 of Andrea Santoro, an Italian priest and seminary classmate of De Donatis. De Donatis has maintained a connection with his hometown by leading spiritual exercises annually during the summer at the Crypt of the Crucifix in Casarano.

He was among seven Roman priests chosen by Archbishop Giovanni Angelo Becciu to eat lunch with Pope Francis after the Chrism Mass in 2013, just two weeks after the Pope's election. In October 2013, Pope Francis, who had met De Donatis only once at that lunch, chose him to preach the 2014 Lenten spiritual exercises of the Roman Curia, an assignment that for fifty years had been given to a cardinal or well-known theologian.

Episcopal ministry 

De Donatis was appointed by Pope Francis on 14 September 2015 the Titular Bishop of Mottola and an Auxiliary Bishop of Rome, where he was responsible for the training of the clergy. He was consecrated a bishop in the Archbasilica of St. John Lateran on 9 November 2015, the feast date of the dedication of the basilica. Pope Francis acted as his principal consecrator, while Cardinal Agostino Vallini, the Vicar General of Rome, and Cardinal Beniamino Stella, the Prefect of the Congregation for the Clergy, acted as co-consecrators. Among the other concelebrants were five auxiliary bishops of Rome. Assisting were Msgr. Luciano Pascucci, director of the Clerical Office of the Roman Vicariate, and Fr. Antonio Schito, pastor of De Donatis' hometown parish of San Domenico in Casarano. Upon being made a bishop, De Donatis adopted his coat of arms with the episcopal motto "nihil caritate dulcius", a phrase taken from Saint Ambrose, which translates from the Latin as "nothing is sweeter than charity."

On 29 April 2016, De Donatis was appointed the rector of the Church of San Sebastiano al Palatino in Rome. On 6 June of that year, he oversaw the jubilee of priests during the Extraordinary Jubilee of 2016 in the Diocese of Rome and was involved in the organization of the jubilee activities in the Diocese of Trapani. He also led the Confessio Vitae during the jubilee year in the Archdiocese of Milan.

In September 2016, De Donatis published Nulla è più dolce dell'amore (Nothing is Sweeter than Love), a collection of twenty reflections on the various forms of mercy as interpreted through the Bible.

On 26 May 2017, having accepted the resignation of Cardinal Agostino Vallini, Pope Francis appointed De Donatis the Vicar General of Rome and Archpriest of the Archbasilica of St. John Lateran, elevating him as well to the rank of archbishop. The Vicar General serves as de facto bishop of Rome on behalf of the pope. De Donatis is the first person since the sixteenth century to be named Vicar General when not a cardinal. As Vicar General he serves ex officio as Grand Chancellor of the Pontifical Lateran University. At the same time, he was made the apostolic administrator of the Suburbicarian Diocese of Ostia.

Cardinalate 
On 20 May 2018, Pope Francis announced he would make De Donatis a cardinal at the next consistory. At the consistory on 28 June 2018, he was assigned the deanery of San Marco, the same church where he served as a parish priest fifteen years earlier.

De Donatis was the apostolic administrator of the Ukrainian Catholic Apostolic Exarchate of Italy from 11 July 2019 to 24 October 2020.

After testing positive for COVID-19, De Donatis entered the Agostino Gemelli University Policlinic with a fever on 30 March 2020; he had not been in physical contact with Pope Francis or visited the Vatican recently. He was released on 10 April and continued to recuperate at home.

Coat of arms

Blazon 
Tierced inverted pall: in the first, red division of the field is contained a winged lion with a halo, with the head front-facing, while crouching and holding with its front legs in front of its chest a golden book bearing in black, capital letters PAX TIBI MARCE in four rows on the first side, and EVANGELISTA MEUS in four rows on the second side. In the second blue division on the right-hand side is a charge of a silver umbraculum. In the third, silver division is a branch with an open pomegranate. A gothic patriarchal cross is behind the shield and a galero, signifying De Donatis' archiepiscopal status.

Before being appointed the Vicar General of Rome, De Donatis' coat of arms as auxiliary bishop was divided into red and silver fields, without the umbraculum on the blue field.

Episcopal motto 
The words of De Donatis' Latin episcopal motto, nihil caritate dulcius ("nothing is sweeter than love" in English), are taken from St. Ambrose's De officiis ministrorum (in English: On the Duties of the Clergy): "Be among you the peace that surpasses all feeling. Love one another. Nothing is sweeter than love, nothing more pleasing than peace."

Interpretation 
The lion of St. Mark the Evangelist, chosen in honor of the saint to whom is dedicated the parish he led before being appointed a bishop, stands on red, which is the color of love and blood. The umbraculum, the symbol of the Bishop of Rome, over a blue background, representing the detachment from earthly values and the ascent of the soul to God. At the bottom is a pomegranate, the symbol of the Passion of Christ, on a background of silver, which symbolizes the purity of the Virgin Mary to whom De Donatis entrusts his episcopal ministry.

See also 
Cardinals created by Francis

Notes

References

External links 

 
 Vicariate of Rome website
 De Donatis, Angelo. Nulla è più dolce dell'amore . Paoline Editoriale Libri, 2016. 
 

 

Living people
21st-century Italian Roman Catholic archbishops
Roman Catholic archbishops in Italy
1954 births
People from the Province of Lecce
Bishops appointed by Pope Francis
Cardinal Vicars
Cardinals created by Pope Francis
Academic staff of the Pontifical Lateran University
Pontifical Lateran University alumni
Pontifical Gregorian University alumni
Pontifical Roman Seminary alumni
Knights of the Holy Sepulchre
21st-century Italian titular bishops
21st-century Italian cardinals